UFC 161: Evans vs. Henderson was a mixed martial arts event held on June 15, 2013, at the MTS Centre in Winnipeg, Manitoba, Canada.

Background
While the UFC has hosted several events in the past in Canada, the event was the first that the organization has hosted in Manitoba.

The event was expected to feature an Interim Bantamweight Championship bout between the current champion Renan Barão, and former WEC Bantamweight Champion and top contender Eddie Wineland.  However, on May 21 it was confirmed that Barão had pulled out of the bout, citing a foot injury.  With, Barão's departure, Wineland was removed from the card as well.  As a result, the scheduled bout between Rashad Evans and Dan Henderson was moved up the card and served as the headliner in a three round bout.

TJ Waldburger was expected to face Sean Pierson at the event.  However, Waldburger was pulled from the event and replaced by Kenny Robertson.

Stipe Miocic was scheduled to face returning veteran Soa Palelei on the undercard, but due to the change in the main event, UFC bolstered the main card and replaced Palelei with Roy Nelson.  As a result, Palelei was removed from the card, but attended fight week activities as potential replacement for either two heavyweight fights at the event.

Isaac Vallie-Flagg was expected to face Sam Stout at the event.  However, Vallie-Flagg was forced out with a back injury and was replaced by James Krause.

Antônio Rogério Nogueira was expected to face Maurício Rua in a rematch in the co-main event. However, Nogueira pulled out of the bout in the days leading up to the event citing a back injury. Chael Sonnen was briefly linked as a replacement for Nogueira. However, an alleged visa issue created a problem for Sonnen to get into Canada, resulting in Rua being pulled from the event altogether.

The preliminary card was headlined by Jake Shields vs Tyron Woodley.

Results

Bonus awards
The following fighters were awarded $50,000 bonuses.

 Fight of the Night: Sam Stout vs. James Krause
 Knockout of the Night: Shawn Jordan
 Submission of the Night: James Krause

See also
List of UFC events
2013 in UFC

References

External links
Official UFC past events page
UFC events results at Sherdog.com

Ultimate Fighting Championship events
Events in Winnipeg
2013 in mixed martial arts
Mixed martial arts in Canada
Sports competitions in Winnipeg
2013 in Canadian sports